Benny Kohlberg (born 17 April 1954 in Arvika, Värmland) is a retired Swedish cross-country skier who competed during the 1980s. He won a gold medal in the 4 × 10 km relay at the 1984 Winter Olympics in Sarajevo.

Kohlberg's best individual finish was third at a World Cup competition in 1982 in Switzerland.

Cross-country skiing results
All results are sourced from the International Ski Federation (FIS).

Olympic Games
 1 medal – (1 gold)

World Championships

World Cup

Season standings

Individual podiums

1 podium

Team podiums
 1 victory
 2 podiums

Note:  Until the 1994 Winter Olympics, Olympic races were included in the World Cup scoring system.

References

External links
 
 

1954 births
Living people
People from Arvika Municipality
Cross-country skiers from Värmland County
Cross-country skiers at the 1980 Winter Olympics
Cross-country skiers at the 1984 Winter Olympics
Olympic cross-country skiers of Sweden
Olympic gold medalists for Sweden
Swedish male cross-country skiers
Olympic medalists in cross-country skiing
Medalists at the 1984 Winter Olympics